Pleuroprucha is a genus of moths in the family Geometridae first described by Heinrich Benno Möschler in 1890.

Species
Pleuroprucha asthenaria (Walker, 1861)
Pleuroprucha insulsaria (Guenée, 1857)

References

Cosymbiini